Walter Gilbert (February 5, 1915 – August 19, 1979) was a college football player from Fairfield, Alabama.

Biography 
Gilbert earned three varsity football letters and was a three time All-American at Auburn University. He starred at center, but also played linebacker. He became a member of the College Football Hall of Fame in 1956. In 1981 Auburn began bestowing the Walter Gilbert Award to distinguished alumni athletes.

1915 births
1979 deaths
American football centers
Auburn Tigers football players
Players of American football from Alabama
College Football Hall of Fame inductees
People from Fairfield, Alabama